Tom Stewart (born 15 March 1993) is a professional Australian rules footballer playing for the Geelong Football Club in the Australian Football League (AFL). At 190 cm (6 ft 3in) tall and 88 kg (194 lb), he plays as a running half-back who can play on both oversized and undersized opponents. Stewart played for the Geelong Falcons and South Barwon Football Club as junior, winning consecutive premierships in 2012 and 2013 with South Barwon.

Stewart was drafted by the Geelong Football Club with their second selection and fortieth overall in the 2016 national draft. He made his debut in the forty-two point win against  in the opening round of the 2017 season at Domain Stadium. Since then Stewart he has been a 4-time All-Australian and was awarded the AFLCA Young Player Award in 2018.

Early football
As a teenager, Stewart played for the Geelong Falcons in the TAC Cup. After going undrafted in numerous drafts went and played for his local club in the Geelong Football Netball League.
Stewart played football for South Barwon Football Club which currently competes in the Geelong Football Netball League, the major regional league in the region. In 2013, Stewart would be a part of South Barwon's premiership which was led by playing coach and Australian Football Hall of Famer, Matthew Scarlett. In 2016, Stewart's performances for the Geelong Football Club's VFL team landed him on the radar of AFL club recruiters. He was drafted at pick 40 in the 2016 national draft by the Geelong Football Club.

AFL career

2017–2019: Early career
On debut, Stewart collected 10 disposals, a rebound-50, a contested mark and 2 tackles. In his debut season, Stewart would become a regular in Geelong's side, holding down his position as a half-back flanker. Stewart underwent surgery to repair a fractured eye socket he suffered in Geelong's dramatic round 14 win over Fremantle. Stewart had an average performance on the night, collecting 11 disposals, 4 rebound-50s and 5 tackles. Stewart would finish his debut year with 21 matches, averaging 14.7 disposals, 2.8 rebound-50s and 4.1 marks a game.

The 2018 AFL season shaped to be Stewart's breakout season which saw him become one of the league's best defenders. After maintaining a consistent  position in Geelong's defensive six during the 2017 season, only missing games to injury, Stewart continued this effort for the 2018 season. In Geelong's round 3 loss to  he received a vote in the AFL Coaches Association Player of the Year award after recording 20 disposals, 13 effective kicks and  3 rebound-50s. This would be a breakout game for the young defender as it saw him earn his first brownlow vote and 7 AFL Coaches Association Player of the Year votes. On April 12, Stewart would re-sign a contract extension with Geelong to remain at the club until the end of 2019. Stewart collected 28 disposals, 7 rebound-50s and 9 marks, 2 of which were contested. For this performance, earned Stewart 9 AFL Coaches Association Player of the Year votes and one brownlow vote, raising his career total to 3 votes. For his remarkable season, Stewart was awarded with numerous accolades. He won the AFLCA Young Player Award, which takes the total number of coaches votes of all players in their first two seasons with the highest vote-getter winning. Steward won the award with 40 votes, 17 higher than second place. He would also earn his first All-Australian selection as a back pocket and finished sixth in the Carji Greeves Medal.

Before the start of the 2019 AFL season, Stewart was elevated to Geelong's seven men leadership team. Geelong captain Joel Selwood praised Stewart's growth from a mature-age draftee to All-Australian and leader at the club within a span of three years. "Mid last year he asked to be a part of meetings and come in and stuff like that," Selwood said. "He was at a stage where his footy was taking care of itself so we didn't want a burden on him but he was relishing the job, so this was just the next step for him." Stewart started the 2019 AFL season as well as he had ended the 2018 season. In his first 4 matches of the season, Stewart averaged 25.5 disposals, 10.5 rebound-50s and 7.3 marks at game. This spectacular form continued all throughout the season with Stewart finishing the season averaging 23.2 disposals, a league high 8.0 rebound-50s and 7.4 marks a game. For his best season thus far, Stewart was rewards with his second All-Australian blazer and a third-place finish in Geelong's best and fairest count.

2020–: Continued success
After establishing himself as one of the premier defenders in the league, Stewart continued with his great form into the 2020 AFL season. He recorded 18 disposals in a round 1 loss against  when the season began in late March, but under extraordinary conditions imposed on the league as a result of the rapid progression of the coronavirus pandemic into Australia. In what the league planned would be the first of a reduced 17-round season, the match was played without crowds in attendance due to public health prohibitions on large gatherings and with quarter lengths reduced by one fifth in order to reduce the physical load on players who would be expected to play multiple matches with short breaks in the second half of the year. Just three days later, the AFL Commission suspended the season for an indefinite period after multiple states enforced quarantine conditions on their borders that effectively ruled out the possibility of continuing the season as planned. After an 11-week hiatus, Stewart contributed 20 disposals in a round 2 win over  when the season resumed in early-June. This would be Stewart's first Grand Final appearance and was among the best for his side, collecting 20 disposals, 10 rebound-50s and 6 marks. Stewart would finish 14th in Carji Greeves Medal. Already contracted until 2021, Stewart would go onto to sign a new contract which would add three years to his existing deal keeping him at Geelong until the end of 2024.

Stewart entered the 2021 AFL season ranked in the 'elite' category among the league's defenders by the AFL's official statistical partner Champion Data. Stewart's 2021 season shaped to be his best season yet. His numbers in disposals and marks were at a career high. He was named in the AFL media's mid-season All-Australian team  on a back pocket. It wasn't just about his defensive efforts however; finishing with 27 disposals and six score involvements, he was able to launch several Cats attacks, including one last-quarter goal. Stewart was praised by many after the game including his coach, "It's one of the best games I've seen a half-back flanker play," Chris Scott said post-game. For his effort he received 9 AFL Coaches Association Player of the Year votes. On the 14th August Stewart injured his foot at training in a marking contest. The 28 year old underwent surgery after suffering Lisfranc damage. This meant that Stewart would miss the rest of the season, including Geelong's finals series. After a career best season, with Stewart averaging 24.0 disposals, 6.1 rebound-50s and a league high 8.9 marks a game, he was awarded his third All-Australian in just five years.

In the 2022 AFL season  during a round 15 match against Richmond Stewart bumped Dion Prestia high, which saw Stewart suspended for four matches.

Player profile
Stewart plays as a rebounding half-back and back pocket. He is known for his ability to break through oppositions forward defensive structures with his elite kicking skill. His marking ability allows him to be one of the best intercept players in the competition being ranked elite by Champion Data for intercept marks and Contested Defence One on Ones. Stewart is also known for both his on-field and off-leadership, with pundits tipping Stewart to be Geelong's next captain.

Stewart was named the seventh best defender and 42nd best player overall in the Herald Sun's list of the best players pre-2020 season.

Statistics
Updated to the end of the 2022 season.

|-
| 2017 ||  || 44
| 21 || 2 || 2 || 189 || 120 || 309 || 86 || 55 || 0.1 || 0.1 || 9.0 || 5.7 || 14.7 || 4.1 || 2.6 || 0
|-
| 2018 ||  || 44
| 22 || 1 || 1 || 296 || 146 || 442 || 132 || 46 || 0.0 || 0.0 || 13.5 || 6.6 || 20.1 || 6.0 || 2.1 || 4
|-
| 2019 ||  || 44
| 25 || 0 || 2 || style="background:#CAE1FF; width:1em" | 473† || 107 || 580 || 185 || 42 || 0.0 || 0.1 || 18.9 || 4.3 || 23.2 || 7.4 || 1.7 || 3
|-
| 2020 ||  || 44
| 18 || 0 || 1 || 263 || 81 || 344 || style="background:#CAE1FF; width:1em" | 125† || 23 || 0.0 || 0.1 || 14.6 || 4.5 || 19.1 || 6.9 || 1.3 || 1
|-
| 2021 ||  || 44
| 20 || 0 || 3 || 378 || 102 || 480 || 178|| 21 || 0.0 || 0.1 || 18.9 || 5.1 || 24.0 || bgcolor=CAE1FF | 8.9† || 1.1 || 8
|-
| scope=row bgcolor=F0E68C | 2022# ||  || 44
| 20 || 0 || 1 || 354 || 111 || 465 || 146 || 40 || 0.0 || 0.1 || 17.7 || 5.6 || 23.3 || 7.3 || 2.0 || 9
|- class=sortbottom
! colspan=3 | Career
! 126 !! 3 !! 10 !! 1953 !! 667 !! 2620 !! 852 !! 227 !! 0.0 !! 0.1 !! 15.5 !! 5.3 !! 20.8 !! 6.8 !! 1.8 !! 25
|}

Notes

Honours and achievements
Team
 AFL premiership player: 2022
 McClelland Trophy: 2019, 2022 

Individual
 4× All-Australian team: 2018, 2019, 2021, 2022
Carji Greeves Medal: 2021
 AFLCA Young Player Award: 2018
 Geelong F.C. Best Young Player Award: 2017

References

External links

1993 births
Living people
Geelong Football Club players
Geelong Football Club Premiership players
Australian rules footballers from Victoria (Australia)
All-Australians (AFL)
One-time VFL/AFL Premiership players
Carji Greeves Medal winners